The Basilica of San Gaudenzio is a church in Novara, Piedmont, northern Italy. It is the highest point in the city.  It is dedicated to Gaudentius of Novara, first Christian bishop of the city.

It was built between 1577 and 1690 following the destruction of the old Basilica, ordered by Emperor Charles V.

The Basilica itself was built by Pellegrino Tibaldi; however, the monumental cupola was designed by Alessandro Antonelli (who also designed the Mole Antonelliana in Torino). The cupola was completed in 1887; it is 121 metres high.

See also
 List of tallest structures built before the 20th century

Roman Catholic churches completed in 1690
17th-century Roman Catholic church buildings in Italy
Churches in the province of Novara
Buildings and structures in Novara
Basilica churches in Piedmont
1690 establishments in Italy
Church buildings with domes